Bloom Township, Kansas may refer to the following places:

 Bloom Township, Clay County, Kansas
 Bloom Township, Ford County, Kansas
 Bloom Township, Osborne County, Kansas

See also 
 List of Kansas townships
 Bloom Township (disambiguation)

Kansas township disambiguation pages